Sarah Aubrey is a British-born Australian actress. She has had guest roles in episodes of Pieces of Her, The Secret Life of Us, All Saints, Water Rats and Frayed, along with numerous animation series and TV commercials. She also won the Best Actress award at the 2002 Tropfest film festival and is one of Australia's top voice talents.

Biography
Aubrey has trained extensively in theatre, television and film. She started at the University of Newcastle where she played the lead in the 1993 production of Agnes of God alongside professional actresses, Julie Kirby and Peggy Thompson, directed by Australian theatre director, David Logan. She went on to further her training at the National Institute of Dramatic Art in Sydney and the British American Drama Academy in Oxford.

Aubrey appeared in the Australian television soap, Home and Away, in 1998 playing Tamara Duncan, in 2000 playing Gilly Austen and again in 2007 playing Judy Holly. In 2000 she also appeared in Above the Law, playing Mary Stafford, in Murder Call, playing Amy Simms. and in All Saints, playing Amanda Morton. In 2001 she appeared in Water Rats, playing Madeleine Fyfe.

Aubrey won best actress at the Tropfest film festival in 2002 for the short film Boomerang and was in the Silverchair video "Ana's Song", which was voted one of the top ten best videos on MTV in the United States in 1999.

In 2005 she appeared in an episode of The Secret Life of Us, playing Camel Toe. She subsequently provided the voices for characters in Dive Olly Dive and Master Raindrop.

In 2006 Aubrey formed a band with Scott Andrew (guitar, vocals), Christopher Campbell (bass, guitar, backing vocals) and Rebecca Clarke (drums, percussion). For two years they performed under the name 'Sarah Aubrey' but renamed the band 'Girl Most Likely'. Their songs have been used on television promotions for The L Word, All Saints and Home and Away. In February 2009 they released a self-titled debut EP.

In December 2022, she was named on The Hollywood Reporters Women in Entertainment Power 100 list.

Filmography
 Home and Away – television series  (1998, 2000, 2007, 2009)
 Marriage Acts – television series (2000)
 Above the Law – television series (2000)
 All Saints – television series (2000)
 Murder Call – television series (2000)
 Water Rats – television series (2001)
 Fairy Tale Police Department – animated television series (2001)
 Sway (2002)
 Boomerang (2002)
 Blinky Bill's Extraordinary Balloon Adventure (2004)
 The Secret Life of Us – television series (2005)
 Seaside Hotel – animated television series (2003, 2004)
 Dive Olly Dive! – animated television series (2006, 2009)
 Deadly! - animated television series, Amy, Sprocket, Reptile/Hilda (2006)
 Staines Down Drains – animated television series (2008)
 Master Raindrop – animated television series (2008)
  Sally Bollywood: Super Detective – animated television series, Sally (2010)
 Rescue: Special Ops – Silva (2010), performing with her band Girl Most Likely
  Happy Feet Two – animated feature film, additional voices (2011)
 Nate is Late - animated television series, Malika and Principal Prudence (2018 and 2022)
 Frayed - Netflix television series, Mrs Porter (2019)
 Tales of Aluna - Animated television series, Aluna (2021)
 Pieces of Her - Netflix television series, Annette Queller (2022)

Discography
 Girl Most Likely – Independent/Waterfront (GML001) (10 February 2009)

References

External links
Official website

Year of birth missing (living people)
Living people
Australian film actresses
Australian people of English descent
Australian television actresses
Australian voice actresses
English film actresses
English television actresses
English voice actresses
Blinky Bill